The AfroBasket 2021 qualification was a basketball competition that was played from January 2020 to July 2021, to determine the fifteen FIBA Africa nations who would join the automatically qualified host Rwanda at the AfroBasket 2021 final tournament.

Pre-qualifiers
The pre-qualifiers were played in January 2020. Five winners from the five zones qualified to the next round.

All times are local.

Group A (Sub-zone 1 & 2)

Algeria won 169–166 on aggregate.

Group B (Sub-zone 3)
Ghana, Liberia and Niger would have participated in this tournament in Liberia. The tournament was cancelled.

Group C (Sub-zone 4)

Group D (Sub-zone 5)

Group E (Sub-zone 6 &7)
The Comoros and South Africa withdrew before the tournament.

Invitational tournament (Inter Sub-zone play-off)
Cape Verde, Chad and South Sudan competed in this group, with the winners qualified for the qualifiers.

Qualifiers
Due to the COVID-19 pandemic, each group played the November 2020 window at a single venue. The same was done for the February 2021 window.

Qualified teams are the 15 teams qualified for African 2019 World Cup qualifiers second round (except Rwanda already qualified as Host) + 5 teams from Pre-Qualifiers

Teams

Draw
The draw was held on 20 december 2019 in Rwanda.
There are 4 seeded pots. Pot 1 contains the TOP 5 at FIBA AfroBasket 2017. Pot 2 & 3 teams ranked at 2019 FIBA Basketball World Cup qualification (Africa), and Pot 4 contains 5 teams from Pre-Qualifiers.

Group A

Group B

Group C
The first matches were played from 21 to 23 February 2020 in Yaoundé, Cameroon.

Group D

Group E

Qualified teams

Notes

References

External links
Qualifiers
Pre-qualifiers

AfroBasket qualification
qualification